Tahtlum Peak is a 6,567-foot-elevation (2,002 meter) mountain summit located east-southeast of Chinook Pass in the William O. Douglas Wilderness. It's situated north of Dewey Lake in Yakima County of Washington state. Tahtlum Peak is part of the Cascade Range and its nearest higher neighbor is Dewey Peak,  to the south. The name tahtlum derives from Chinook Jargon which means ten. Precipitation runoff from Tahtlum Peak drains into tributaries of the Yakima River.

Gallery

References

External links
 National Forest Service web site: William O Douglas Wilderness

Cascade Range
Mountains of Washington (state)
Mountains of Yakima County, Washington
Chinook Jargon place names
North American 2000 m summits